Table tennis at the 2015 Southeast Asian Games is being held in the Singapore Indoor Stadium, in Kallang, Singapore from 1 to 8 June 2015.

Participating nations
A total of 67 athletes from nine nations are competing in table tennis at the 2015 Southeast Asian Games:

Competition schedule
The following is the competition schedule for the table tennis competitions:

Medalists

Medal table

References

External links
 

 
2015
Southeast Asian Games
Table tennis competitions in Singapore
2015 Southeast Asian Games events
Kallang